The ASEA electric locomotive was an electric locomotive type originally operated by Ferrocarriles Vascongados in the Basque Country, Spain. When that company was absorbed by FEVE, it came to be known as the FEVE 4200 series. It was later operated by Euskotren.

History
In the aftermath of the Spanish Civil War, Ferrocarriles Vascongados experienced a surge in passenger and freight traffic. As a result, the company ordered three locomotives to ASEA, which had manufactured four electric locomotives for Ferrocarriles Vascongados in the early 1930s. The three new locomotives were mechanically very similar to the older ones, but featured a more modern exterior design. Unlike the previous locomotives, whose mechanical parts were built by CAF in Beasain, Spain; the new ones were built entirely by ASEA in Västerås, Sweden. As of 2005, they were the last narrow-gauge electric locomotives to have been imported into Spain.

After the original operator was absorbed into FEVE in 1972, the locomotives were renumbered as 4201 to 4203. This period saw a decline in freight traffic which coupled with the retirement of some multiple unit types meant the 4200 series (as well as the 4000 and 4100 series) was increasingly used to haul local train services. After the establishment of Euskotren in 1982 (known at the time as ET/FV), they were transferred to the new company. After 1988 they were retired from passenger service, and were used exclusively as shunters. As part of the refurbishment, their exterior was reformed, they were fitted with Alliance couplers and their cabins were made similar to the ones used by 200 series trains. They were retired from service in 2010.

Numbering and naming
The locomotives were named after mountains of the Basque Country. Their individual details are as follows.

See also
 Ferrocarriles Vascongados § Rolling stock

References

External links
 

Electric locomotives of Spain
Euskotren rolling stock
Ferrocarriles Vascongados rolling stock
FEVE rolling stock
Railway locomotives introduced in 1950
ASEA locomotives
Bo′Bo′ locomotives
Bo-Bo locomotives
Metre gauge electric locomotives
1500 V DC locomotives